Mount Duemler is a mountain,  high, rising southwest of the head of Anthony Glacier and 11 nautical miles (20 km) west of Mount Bailey, 4 nautical miles (7 km) southwest from Brand Peak inland from the east coast of Palmer Land. This feature was first chartered by the British Graham Land Expedition under John Rymill in 1936–37. It was photographed from the air by the United States Antarctic Service in 1940, and the Ronne Antarctic Research Expedition (RARE) under Finn Ronne in 1947, and recharted in 1947 by a joint sledge party consisting of members of the RARE and the Falkland Islands Dependencies Survey. It was named by Ronne for R.F. Duemler, vice president of the Delaware, Lackawanna and Western Coal Co., New York City, which contributed coal to the expedition.

References 

Mountains of Palmer Land